"On the Sunny Side of the Street" is a 1930 song composed by Jimmy McHugh with lyrics by Dorothy Fields. Some authors say that Fats Waller was the composer, but he sold the rights to the song. It was introduced in the Broadway musical Lew Leslie's International Revue starring Harry Richman and Gertrude Lawrence.

Ted Lewis did the first recording of the song in 1930 (Catalog #2144-D), followed by Harry Richman (Catalog # 4747) and both enjoyed hit records with the song.

Other notable recordings
Having become a jazz standard, it was played by Louis Armstrong, the Nat King Cole Trio, Dave Brubeck, Earl Hines, Benny Goodman, Lionel Hampton, Erroll Garner, Dizzy Gillespie, Art Tatum, James Booker, Count Basie, and Lester Young. The Louis Armstrong version was recorded in the key of C major, but it has been recorded in a range of keys; Ted Lewis recorded it in D major and Ella Fitzgerald in G major.

Cover versions date as far back as 1930, when Layton & Johnstone released the song for Columbia. The song was recorded by Billie Holiday, Bing Crosby (January 21, 1946 with Lionel Hampton), Dinah Washington, Ella Fitzgerald, Judy Garland, Doris Day, Brenda Lee (1961), Frankie Laine, Keely Smith, Nat King Cole, Jo Stafford with The Pied Pipers (a No. 17 hit in 1945), Frank Sinatra, Willie Nelson, Jon Batiste, Rod Stewart, & Storm Gordon. Arguably the most popular arrangement was by Tommy Dorsey and The Sentimentalists, which achieved chart success in 1945 reaching the No. 16 spot.
In 1975 rockband Trapeze covered the song on their self-titled album Trapeze and was also released as a 7" single but it did not chart.

In popular culture
The song was featured in the 1991 film JFK, the 1995 film Father of the Bride Part II, in an episode of the sitcom Frasier and in the fourth episode of the fourth season of Northern Exposure, series in 1992.
Also in the fourteenth episode of the third season of Cheers, series in 1985. where several characters each sing part of the song one after the other as if by contagion after walking past each other.

See also
 List of 1930s jazz standards

References

External links
 "On the Sunny Side of the Street" at Jazz Standards

Songs about streets
1920s jazz standards
1930 songs
Songs with lyrics by Dorothy Fields
Songs with music by Jimmy McHugh
Louis Armstrong songs
Benny Goodman songs
Frankie Laine songs
Judy Garland songs
Nat King Cole songs
Frank Sinatra songs
The Coasters songs
Willie Nelson songs
Barry Manilow songs
Cyndi Lauper songs
Rod Stewart songs
Little Willie Littlefield songs
Pop standards
Jazz compositions in C major
Jazz compositions in E-flat major
Ella Fitzgerald songs